Jimmy Simpson is an American professional stock car racing driver. He has raced in the NASCAR Craftsman Truck Series.

Motorsports career results

NASCAR
(key) (Bold – Pole position awarded by qualifying time. Italics – Pole position earned by points standings or practice time. * – Most laps led.)

Craftsman Truck Series

References

External links
 

Year of birth missing (living people)
NASCAR drivers
Living people
People from Concord, North Carolina
Racing drivers from Charlotte, North Carolina
Racing drivers from North Carolina